Ralph Brideoake (1612/13–1678) was an English clergyman, who became Bishop of Chichester.

Life

Born in Cheetham Hill, Manchester, and baptised on 31 January 1612 (NS 1613) at the Collegiate Church, Manchester, Brideoake graduated from Brasenose College, Oxford with a BA in 1634, and made a MA by Charles I of England in 1636. During the 1630s, Brideoake attempted to write poetry.

Beginning in 1638, Brideoake was High Master at Manchester Free School, but lost the position because of his Royalist affiliation. He became chaplain to James Stanley, 7th Earl of Derby, a Royalist leader, and was besieged at Lathom House (near Ormskirk, Lancashire) with Stanley's family in 1644. He interceded, unsuccessfully, with William Lenthall, Speaker of Parliament, for a stay of the execution of the captured Earl, in 1651. Brideoake then became chaplain to Lenthall.

Brideoake was Vicar of Witney from 1654. On the Restoration, he became Rector of Standish in 1660, Dean of Salisbury in 1667, and Bishop of Chichester in 1675. During this time he had some connection with the almshouses at Heytesbury, within Salisbury diocese, for he bought a mill at Chirton on behalf of the charity in 1671.

In 1660 he was appointed Canon of the eleventh stall at St George's Chapel, Windsor Castle, a position he held until 1678. He died on 5 October 1678 and is buried in St. George's Chapel, Windsor Castle. His monument was sculpted by William Bird of Oxford.

Notes

External links

 

1613 births
1679 deaths
Bishops of Chichester
17th-century Church of England bishops
High Masters of Manchester Grammar School
People from Cheetham Hill
Deans of Salisbury
Canons of Windsor
People educated at Manchester Grammar School
Alumni of Brasenose College, Oxford